Türkenfeld (German literally: “Turkfield”) is a municipality in the district of Fürstenfeldbruck, Bavaria, Germany.

Geography
Türkenfeld is located about 14 km south-west of Fürstenfeldbruck and 37 km west of Munich. The municipality has incorporated the communities of Burgholz, Klotzau, Türkenfeld, Peutenmühle, Pleitmannswang, and Zankenhausen.

History
The first evidence of settlement is a burial place dating from Neolithic. In the area of Türkenfeld one can also find several Tumuli from about 1500 BC.

The first written reference is in the Breves Notatiae of 749 as "Duringveld".

During World War II, a subcamp of Dachau concentration camp was built in the town, though it was never put into operation due to construction failures.

Infrastructure
Public facilities in Türkenfeld comprise a kindergarten, a primary school, and a Hauptschule as well as a natatorium. There are also several restaurants in the town.

References

 Timeline of Türkenfeld

External links

  

Fürstenfeldbruck (district)
Tumuli in Germany